The 1999–2000 Algerian Championnat National 2 season.

League table
A total of 14 teams contested the division.

References

Algerian Ligue 2 seasons
2
Algeria